Merel de Knegt (born 9 May 1979 in Tilburg) is a Dutch runner. She is the sister of Gerben de Knegt. Her sole major international outing for the Netherlands was the 2006 IAAF World Road Running Championships, where she came 47th overall.

She won the 2009 Rotterdam Half Marathon. She finished tenth at the 2010 edition, but her time of 2:38:41 was a personal best and as the top domestic finisher she was elected the Dutch champion. At the 2012 CPC Loop Den Haag (The Hague), de Knegt reached the podium with a third-place finish.

Career highlights

Dutch National Championships
2006 - The Hague, 3rd, Half marathon
2007 - Schoorl, 1st, 10 km
2007 - The Hague, 1st, Half marathon
2009 - Tilburg, 1st, 10 km
2010 - Rotterdam, 1st, marathon (10th overall in Rotterdam Marathon)

Personal bests

References

1979 births
Living people
Dutch female long-distance runners
Dutch female marathon runners
Sportspeople from Tilburg
20th-century Dutch women
21st-century Dutch women